Offend Maggie is the ninth studio album by Deerhoof, released October 7, 2008 on Kill Rock Stars. Over the summer the band put up sheet music for the song "Fresh Born" online, and invited fans to record their own version. The title track is streaming on the label's website, while Wired is streaming short clips of various songs on the album.

The album was issued in the UK on October 13, 2008 via ATP Recordings.

Critical reception

Reviews were generally positive with most critics noting the band's move towards a more mature, guitar-oriented rock sound - "The album's all fretboard, no circuit board, and it feels most comfortable that way."

Track listing
All songs written and composed by Ed Rodriguez, Greg Saunier, John Dieterich, and Satomi Matsuzaki.

CD

Vinyl

Personnel
Deerhoof - production, mixing
Ian Pellicci, Jay Pellicci - recording, vocals
Eli Crews - recording
Tomoo Gokita - art work
Hodaka Hamada - design

References

External links
 Billboard review of Offend Maggie

2008 albums
Deerhoof albums
Kill Rock Stars albums